Clarias is a genus of catfishes (order Siluriformes) of the family Clariidae, the airbreathing catfishes. The name is derived from the Greek chlaros, which means lively, in reference to the ability of the fish to live for a long time out of water.

Taxonomy
Clarias has been found to be paraphyletic. A species of Heterobranchus (H. longifilis) clusters deeply inside the Clarias group.

Distribution
They are found in inland waters throughout much of the Old World, and are one of the most widespread catfish genera in the world. The genus is found in Southeast Asia and East Asia westwards through India and the Asia Minor to Africa. The diversity of these catfishes is highest in Africa. Some (notably the walking catfish) have become pest species where they have been accidentally introduced, and particularly in Cuba, where their introduction was intentional.

Description
Clarias species are recognized by their long-based dorsal and anal fins, which give them a rather eel-like appearance. These fish have slender bodies, a flat, bony head, and a broad, terminal mouth with four pairs of barbels. They also have a large, accessory breathing organ composed of modified gill arches. Also, only the pectoral fins have spines.

Importance to economy

Many of the species are of great economic importance in both fisheries and fish culture.

Species

There are currently 62 species recognized in this genus:

African species

Asian species

Fossil species
 Clarias falconeri † Lydekker, 1886, from India

Invasive species
Clarias catfish and primarily Clarias batrachus (walking catfish) have been introduced to many different areas of the world, where they are causing problems for the native wildlife. The effect of introduction of these fish varies from area to area, but as they are predatory, they often affect the local wildlife by eating other fish, birds, and amphibians. In Florida, the fish are causing problems by invading aquaculture farms and preying on the fish cultivated there.  Countries where one or several Clarias species have been introduced include Indonesia, the United States, Hong Kong, China, UK, Papua New Guinea, Guam, Taiwan, Thailand, and Cuba.

References

External links

 
Fish of Africa
Fish of Asia
Freshwater fish genera
Catfish genera
Taxa named by Giovanni Antonio Scopoli